Swinging the Lead is a 1934 British comedy film directed by David MacKane and starring William Hartnell, Moira Lynd and Gibb McLaughlin.

Premise
Some criminals sell a drug that changes people's personalities.

Cast
 William Hartnell ...  Freddy Fordum
 Moira Lynd ...  Joan Swid
 Gibb McLaughlin ...  Inigo Larsen
 Marie Ault ...  Mrs. Swid
 George Rogers ...  Benjamin Brown
 Nita Harvey ...  Peggy

References

External links

1934 films
1934 comedy films
British comedy films
British black-and-white films
1930s English-language films
1930s British films